Julio Cabral Teehankee  is a Filipino political scientist. He is Full Professor of Political Science and International Studies at De La Salle University (DLSU) where he served as Chair of the Political Science Department (1994–2007); Chair of the International Studies Department (2008–2013); and Dean of the College of Liberal Arts (2013–2017).

He continuously aims to bridge theory and practice in academic and other professional endeavors. Aside from teaching and research, he has served as political and policy consultant to government officials, electoral candidates, political parties, national and international organizations.

Teehankee specializes in the comparative analysis and development of East and Southeast Asia, with particular focus on elections, party politics, democratization and governance. He has published papers on elections, party politics, and political dynasties in the Philippines, Japan and Southeast Asia.

He has been cited as one of only four political scientists in the 2015 Webometrics' List of 150 Top Scientists in the Philippines based on Google Scholar citations. His research works have been indexed in Scopus and Web of Science-Social Sciences Citation Index. He was co-editor of Building Inclusive Democracies in ASEAN, a recipient of the 2016 National Academy of Science and Technology (NAST) Outstanding Book Award.

Teehankee has been quoted by The New York Times, The Washington Post, and The Economist. His political commentaries have been published by the East Asia Forum, New Mandala, and Asia Dialogue. He has appeared regularly on media as a political analyst.

Education 
Julio Teehankee finished his elementary education at the Ateneo de Manila University from 1972 to 1980. He attended high school at La Salle Greenhills from 1980 to 1984.

He obtained both his doctorate degree in Development Studies (with distinction in 2001) and his bachelor's degree major in Political Science (1988) from De La Salle University. He earned his master's degree in Political Science (1994) from the University of the Philippines Diliman.

From 2007 to 2008, he completed his postdoctoral studies at the Graduate Schools of Law and Politics at the University of Tokyo under a Japan Foundation fellowship.

Personal background 
His paternal grandfather José Tee Han Kee, immigrated to the Philippines in 1901 from Amoy (now Xiamen), China. He was a close associate and friend of Sun Yat-Sen, and was active in the struggle to liberate China from the Qing (Manchu) dynasty.  He was the first medical director of the Chinese General Hospital in Manila. Dr. Tee Han Kee established the Chinese General Hospital School of Nursing  in 1921 and the Filipino-Chinese Medical Society in 1933. He also founded Farmacia Central - the largest prewar drugstore in Manila and precursor of Mercury Drugstore.

Julio's uncle, Claudio Teehankee, was the 16th Chief Justice of the Supreme Court of the Philippines. Julio's maternal grandfather, Pedro G. Cabral founded the Laboratorio de P. Cabral in 1923. His aunt Myrna O. Cabral became the Mother Superior of the Holy Spirit Adoration Order (also known as the Pink Sisters) in the Philippines. Myrna took the name Sister Mary Hermenegildes, and later became the order's Mother Prioress and served as spiritual adviser to former president Corazon C. Aquino and Pope John Paul II.

Visiting fellowships 
Julio Teehankee was a visiting fellow at the Center for Southeast Asian Studies, Kyoto University, Japan in 2020. Previously, he was a visiting fellow at the Philippines Project of the School of Regulation and Global Governance, College of Asia and the Pacific, Australian National University in 2019; at the Southeast Asia Research Centre, City University of Hong Kong in 2018; at the Osaka School of International Public Policy, Osaka University in 2015; at the Japan Institute for International Affairs in 2002; a Sumitomo Foundation research grantee at the Waseda Institute of Asia Pacific Studies, Waseda University in 2000; a Fulbright American Studies fellow at Southern Illinois University at Carbondale in 2000; and, a Japan Foundation faculty development grantee at Ibaraki University, Japan from July 1995 to July 1996.

Major publications

Books 
 Imperious and Imperiled: The Paradox of the Philippine Presidency, co-authored with Mark R. Thompson [forthcoming]
 Patronage Politics in the Philippines: Clans, Clients, and Competition in Local Elections, co-edited with Cleo Calimbahin [forthcoming]
 Rethinking Parties in Democratizing Asia [forthcoming]
 Debate on Federal Philippines, co-edited with Eduardo Araral, Gilberto Llanto, Jonathan Malaya, and Ronald Mendoza, Quezon City: Ateneo de Manila University Press/Bughaw, 2017.
 Building Inclusive Democracies in ASEAN, co-edited with Ronald Mendoza, Edsel Beja Jr., Antonio La Viña, and Maria Villamejor-Mendoza, Mandaluyong: Anvil Publishing Inc., 2015. (2016 National Academy of Science and Technology Outstanding Book Award)
 Rethinking Japan’s Foreign Policy: State, Society, and Security. Manila: Yuchengco Center for East Asia, 2002.
 Japanese Party Politics and Governance in Transition. Manila: Yuchengco Center for East Asia, 2002.

Book chapters 
 “Rethinking Patronage Politics in the Philippines.” In Teehankee, J. C and Calimbahin, A (Eds.) Patronage Politics in the Philippines: Clans, Clients, and Machines in Local Politics, [forthcoming].
 "Introduction: Taking a Second Look at Asian Political Parties.” In Teehankee, J. C. (Ed.) Rethinking Parties in Democratizing Asia, [forthcoming].
 “Untangling the Party List System.” In Hutchcroft P. (Ed.) Strong Patronage, Weak Parties: The Case for Electoral Reform in the Philippines.Mandaluyong: Anvil Publishing Inc., 2019, 145-161.
 "Accountability Challenges to Sustainable Development Goals in Southeast Asia.” In Holzhacker, R. and Agussalim, D. (Eds.), Sustainable Development Goals in Southeast Asia and ASEAN. Singapore: Brill, 2019, 79-97.
 “House of Clans: Political Dynasties in the Philippine Legislature.” In Thompson, M.R. and Batalla E.C. (Eds.) Routledge Handbook of Contemporary Philippines. London and New York: Routledge., 2018, 85-96.
 “Strengthening the Party List System as a List Proportional Representation Election System.” In Malaya, J. (Ed.). The Quest for a Federal Philippines, 110-122. Pasay: PDP Laban Federalism Institute., 2017, 98-110.
 “Rationale and Features of Federalism.” In Araral, E. et al. Debate on Federal Philippines, Quezon City: Ateneo de Manila University Press/Bughaw, 2017, 9-44.
 “Was Duterte’s Rise Inevitable?” In Curato, N. (Ed.) A Duterte Reader: Critical Essays on Rodrigo Duterte’s Early Presidency. Quezon City: Ateneo de Manila University Press/Bughaw., 2017, 39-58.
 “Institutionalizing Political Party Reforms in the Philippines.” In Mendoza, R.U., Beja, E.L. Jr., Teehankee, J.C. La Viña, A.G.M., and Villamejor-Mendoza, M.F.V. (Eds.) Building Inclusive Democracies in ASEAN. Mandaluyong: Anvil Publishing Inc., 2015, 308-318.
 “The Philippines” in Blondel, J., Inoguchi, T., and Marsh, I. (Eds.) Political Parties and Democracy: Western Europe, East and Southeast Asia 1990-2010. Basingstoke, Hampshire: Palgrave Macmillan, 2012, 187-205.
 “Clientelism and Party Politics in the Philippines,” in Tomas, D. and Ufen, A. (Eds.) Clientelism and Electoral Competition in Indonesia, Thailand and the Philippines. Oxford, UK: Routledge, 2012, 186-214.
 “Been There, Done That: Southeast Asian Response to the Global Financial Crisis?" In Global Financial Crisis and Its Impacts on Asia. Seoul, Korea: Konrad Adenauer Stiftung, 2010, 39-67.
 “Image, Issues and Machinery: Presidential Campaigns in Post-1986 Philippines," In Kasuya, Y. and Quimpo, N. (Eds.). The Politics of Change in the Philippines. Manila: Anvil, 2010, 114-161.
 “Citizen-Party Linkages: Failure to Connect?” In Herberg, M. (Ed.) Reforming the Philippine Party System: Ideas and Initiatives, Debates and Dynamics. Pasig: Friedrich Ebert Stiftung, 2009, 23-44.
 “Consolidation or Crisis of Clientelistic Democracy? The 2004 Synchronized Elections in the Philippines,” in Croissant, A. & Martin, B. (Eds.), Between Consolidation and Crisis: Elections and Democracy in Five Nations in Southeast Asia. Berlin: Lit Verlag, 2006, 215-276.
 “Election Campaigning in the Philippines," in Schafferer, C. (Ed.) Election Campaigning in East and Southeast Asia. Aldershot: Ashgate, 2005, 79-101.
 “Electoral Politics in the Philippines,” in Croissant, A., Bruns, G., & John, M (Eds.), Electoral Politics in Southeast & East Asia Singapore: Freidrich Ebert Stiftung, 2002, 149-202.

Journal articles 
 "Duterte’s Populism and the 2019 Midterm Election: An Anarchy of Parties?” co-authored with Yuko Kasuya, Philippine Political Science Journal [forthcoming].
 “Factional Dynamics in Philippine Party Politics, 1900-2019,” Journal of Contemporary Southeast Asian Affairs, Vol. 39 (1), 2020, 98–123.
 “The 2019 Midterm Elections in the Philippines: Party System Pathologies and Duterte’s Populist Mobilization,” co-authored with Yuko Kasuya, Asian Journal of Comparative Politics, Vol. 5(1), 2020, 69–81.
 “Mapping the Philippines’ Defective Democratization,” co-authored with Cleo Calimbahin, Asian Affairs: An American Review, 47(2), 2020, 97-125
 “Les catastrophes humanitaires et l’essor de de la philanthropie religieuse mondialisée [Disasters and the Rise of Global Religious Philanthropy],” co-authored with Jayeel Cornelio Diogene, 2016, 122-139.
 “Regional Dimensions of the 2016 General Elections in the Philippines,” Regional and Federal Studies, Volume 28 Issue 3, 2018, 383-394.
 “Duterte’s Resurgent Nationalism in the Philippines: A Discursive Institutionalist Analysis,” Journal of Current Southeast Asian Affairs, 35 (3), 2016, 69-89.
 “The Vote in the Philippines: Electing A Strongman,” co-authored with Mark R. Thompson, Journal of Democracy, Volume 27 Issue 4, 2016, 124-34.
 “Weak State, Strong Presidents: Situating the Duterte Presidency in Philippine Political Time,” Journal of Developing Societies, Volume 32 Issue 3, 2016, 293-321.
 “The Philippines in 2015: The Calm Before the Political Storm,” Philippine Political Science Journal, Volume 37 Issue 1, 2016, 228-238.
 “The Study of Politics in Southeast Asia: The Philippines in Southeast Asian Political Studies,” Philippine Political Science Journal, 35 (1), 2014, 1-18.
 “Party.Politics.Ph: Internet Campaigning in the Philippines,” Philippine Political Science Journal, 31 (54), 2010, 87-116.
 “Synthesis and Distillation of Policy Issues: What Should Governments Do? The Global Financial Crisis as a Market and Government Failure” Asia-Pacific Social Science Review, 9 (1), 2009, 85-90.
 “The Political Aftermath of the 1997 Crisis: From Asian Values to Asian Governance? Dialogue + Cooperation 18, 2007, 25-39.
 “Access to Justice Indicators in the Asia-Pacific Region,” Arellano Law and Policy Review, 7 (1), 2006, 62-79.
 “Institutional Continuity and the 2004 Philippines Election,” Dialogue + Cooperation 11, 2005, 63-67.
 “Emerging Dynasties in the Post-Marcos House of Representatives,” Philippine Political Science Journal, Volume 22, Number 45, 2001, 55-78.
 “Internal Armed Conflicts and the Peace Process in the Philippines,” Kajian Malaysia Volume 18 Numbers 1 & 2. June–December 2000, 141-156.
 "Dynamics of Local Politics in Ibaraki Prefecture and Mito City after the Collapse of the 1955 System," Bulletin of College of General Education Ibaraki University, Volume 30, 1996, 343-350.
 “Party Politics and Philippine Political Development: An Assessment of the 1987, 1988 and 1992 Elections,” Praxis: Journal of Political Studies, Volume VII, Number 1, April 1995, 47-65.
 “The Context of Political Transition in Post-EDSA Philippines,” Praxis: Journal of Political Studies, Volume VI, Number 1 June 1994, 60-71.
 "The State, Illegal Logging and Environmental NGOs in the Philippines," Kasarinlan: Journal of the Third World Studies Center, Volume 9, Number 1 Third Quarter, 1993, 19-34.
 “The Spatio-temporal Roots of the Filipino Nation: A Reassessment of the Revolution of 1896, ” Praxis: Journal of Political Studies, Volume V, Number 1, 1991-1993, 30-43.
 “Between the Devil and the Deep Blue Sea: An Overview of the Legislature's Response to the Bases Issue,” DLSU Dialogue: Official Journal of De La Salle University, Volume XXIV, Number 1, 1989-1990, 15-25.

Networks and professional organizations 
Teehankee has held leadership positions in prominent professional organizations: Council Member (2019-2021) of the International Political Science Association (IPSA); President (2016-2019) and Secretary (1995-1999) of the Philippine Political Science Association (PPSA); President (2009-2011) and Executive Secretary (2011-2016) of the Asian Political and International Studies Association (APISA); Adviser (since 2016) of the Association of Political Consultants of Asia (APCA); Adviser (since 2017) the Philippine International Studies Organization (PhISO).

He serves as the Regional Manager for Southeast Asia and the Pacific of the Varieties of Democracy (V-Dem) project. V-Dem produces the largest global dataset on democracy with some 28 million data points for 202 countries from 1789 to 2019. Previously, he has served as Country Evaluator for the Bertelsmann Transformation Index (BTI) reports for 2003 and 2014; and as Country Reporter for 2006, 2008, 2010, and 2012. BTI is a 128 country project focusing on the political management of the transformation toward Democracy and a Market Economy.

Teehankee is the associate editor of the Philippine Political Science Journal. He was former editor of the Asia Pacific Social Science Review. He is also a member of the editorial boards of a number of Scopus-indexed academic journals that include: the Asia Pacific Social Science Review, the Journal of Current Southeast Asian Affairs, the Asian Journal of Comparative Politics, and Asian Affairs: An American Review.

He is a lifetime member of the Pi Gamma Mu Honor Society, Beta Chapter, Philippines.

References 

Filipino political scientists
Ateneo de Manila University alumni
De La Salle University alumni
University of the Philippines Diliman alumni
Academic staff of De La Salle University
University of Tokyo alumni
Filipino people of Chinese descent